R. V. Cassill, full name Ronald Verlin Cassill, (May 17, 1919 – March 25, 2002) was a prolific writer, reviewer,  editor, painter and lithographer. He is most notable for his novels and short stories, through which he won several awards and grants.

Life and work

Early years and military service
Cassill was born on May 17, 1919 in Cedar Falls, Iowa to Howard Cassill, a school superintendent, and Mary Glosser, a teacher; he had two brothers, Donald Cassill and H. Carroll Cassill, and a sister, LaJean. After graduating from Blakesburg High School, he earned a B.A. in art at The University of Iowa in 1939, where he was a member of the Phi Beta Kappa Society. From 1942 to 1946, Cassill served the United States Army in the Medical Administration Core as a first lieutenant, stationed in the South Pacific.

Studies, early writings, and art work
Cassill's wartime experiences culminated in his short story "The Conditions of Justice," published in 1947, and won him his first Atlantic Monthly.

For less than a year after having returned from the war, Cassill studied art at the Art Institute of Chicago in 1946, where his artistic skills flourished. He mounted exhibits in Chicago in 1946 and 1948.

After studying in Chicago, he returned to the University of Iowa, earning his M.A. in 1947. In 1949 he briefly served as an instructor at the University's Writer's Workshop before attending the Sorbonne in 1952 for a year as a Fulbright Fellow, studying comparative literature. Cassill worked as an editor for the Western Review of Iowa City from 1951 to 1952, Collier's Encyclopedia from 1953 to 1954, and Dude and Gent in 1958.

Cassill wrote about 15 "paperback originals" in the 1950s and early 1960s. Assessing these early writings, The New York Times''' remarked that "Cassill shows that he can combine paperback storytelling at its strongest with subtle literary quality."

Teaching career
Cassill took a lecturing position at the University of Washington in Seattle in 1955; in 1957 he taught in New York, where he became a lecturer at both Columbia University and the New School for Social Research. Between the shift of moving from the west coast to the east coast, Cassill fell in love and married writer Karilyn Kay Adams on November 23, 1956. (An earlier marriage to artist Kathleen Rosecranz ended in divorce.) Together they had three children, Orin, Jesse, and Erica Cassill. Cassill returned to the University of Iowa in the same capacity in 1960 where he would teach for a few years at the Iowa Writer's Workshop. Among some of the students who took classes with Cassill at the Iowa Writer's Workshop during this time, and would later go on to achieve some measure of acclaim, included Clark Blaise, Raymond Carver, and Joy Williams.

His next position was as writer-in-residence at Purdue University from 1965 to 1966. Soon after beginning teaching at Brown University, Cassill founded the Associated Writing Programs (now known as the Association of Writers & Writing Programs) in 1967. Cassill was appointed Associate Professor at Brown University in 1966 and then to Professor of English in 1972 where he remained until his retired from teaching as Professor emeritus in 1983. In addition to his teaching, Cassill served as U.S. Information Service lecturer in Europe from 1975 to 1976. During this time, he mounted another art exhibit in 1970. After retiring from Brown University, Cassill became the editor of The Norton Anthology of Short Fiction, retaining this position for nearly a quarter century, until his death.

In 1973, Cassill created a controversy when his essay, “Up the Down Co-ed,” was published in Esquire magazine with subtitle "Notes on the Eternal Problem of Fornication With Students." In it he boasted about having slept with numerous young college women and lamented that the newly liberated women of the 1970s preferred men their own age.

"When I met him in Providence," says Robert Day. "Verlin was having a bad day. Esquire had just published his piece “Up the Down Coed,” and the student newspaper at Brown had run the headline: Verlin Cassill:  Another D.H. Lawrence or just a Dirty Old Man?  Kay (his wife) was not amused."

Death
Cassill died at Rhode Island Hospital, Providence, Rhode Island, in March 2002. At the time of his death, he was survived by his wife, two sons (Orin E., of New York City, and Jesse B., of San Diego), and a daughter, Erica Cassill Wood of Saline, Michigan; a brother, H. Carroll, of Cleveland, Ohio; a sister, LaJean Holstein of Ellsworth, Maine; and seven grandchildren.

Awards
In 1995 the American Academy of Arts and Letters awarded Cassill the Academy Award for Literature.
Cassill received the Atlantic Monthly's "Firsts" prize for a short story in 1947. He won the O. Henry short-story award for "The Prize" in 1956. He was given a Rockefeller grant in 1954 and a Guggenheim Fellowship in 1968.

Literary work and legacy

Cassill's prolific career writing and publishing, along with a wide array of interests beyond fiction, make it difficult to summarize the thematic nature and concerns of his work. His stories and novels concern bucolic life in the midwest, the life of the artist or academic, and at times extend into autobiography. A preoccupation with the fates of couples, in alienation and union, is exhibited in much of his fiction, as is the warring of emotional and rational impulses in individuals and pairs. A strong visual identification is intrinsic in his prose, likely due to his training as a visual artist. His most famous novels were probably Doctor Cobb's Game and Clem Anderson, but both the sheer breadth of his writing, and his pervasive influence as a writing teacher, have secured Cassill's legacy in modern fiction.

Cassill's papers are archived at the Mugar Memorial Library at Boston University.

Author website: www.rvcassill.com

Bibliography

NovelsThe Eagle on the Coin (1950)Dormitory Women (1953)The Left Bank of Desire (1955) (with Eric Protter)A Taste of Sin (1955)The Hungering Shame (1956)The Wound of Love (1956)An Affair to Remember (1957) (as Owen Aherne)Naked Morning (1957)Man on Fire (1957) (as Owen Aherne)The Buccaneer (1958)Lustful Summer (1958)The Tempest (1959)The Wife Next Door (1960)Clem Anderson (1960)My Sister's Keeper (1961)Night School (1961)Nurses' Quarters (1962)Pretty Leslie (1963)The President (1964)La Vie Passionée of Rodney Buckthorne: A Tale of the Great American's Last Rally and Curious Death (1968)Doctor Cobb's Game (1969)The Goss Women (1974)Hoyt's Child (1976)Labors of Love (1980)Flame (1980)After Goliath (1985)The Unknown Soldier (1991)Jack Horner in Love and War (2015)

Short storiesThe Conditions of Justice (1947)The First Day Of School (1954)15 x 3 (1957) (with Herbert Gold and James B. Hall)The Father and Other Stories (1965)The Happy Marriage and Other Stories (1965)Three Stories (1982)The Rationing of Love (1987)Patrimonies (1988)Collected Stories (1989)
 "The Covenant" (1965)
 Late Stories (1995)

OtherThe General Said "Nuts":  Exciting Moments of Our History—As Recalled by Our Favorite American Slogans, New York:  Birk (1955)Writing Fiction (1975)In an Iron Time: Statements and Reiterations: Essays (1967)Intro 1-3 (1968–1970) (editor)Intro 4 (1972) (editor, with Walton Beacham)Norton Anthology of Short Fiction (1978–2001) (editor)Norton Anthology of Contemporary Fiction'' (1998) (editor with Joyce Carol Oates)

Notes

References
Louis Menand - Show or Tell (The New Yorker) 2009.
Biographical Note in the Guide to the R. Verlin Cassill Manuscripts

External links
Interview with Cassill from 1999

1919 births
2002 deaths
20th-century American novelists
American book editors
American lithographers
American magazine editors
American male novelists
20th-century American painters
American male painters
21st-century American painters
Artists from Iowa
Painters from Rhode Island
Brown University faculty
Columbia University faculty
The New School faculty
Purdue University faculty
University of Iowa alumni
University of Iowa faculty
Iowa Writers' Workshop faculty
Novelists from Iowa
Writers from Rhode Island
People from Cedar Falls, Iowa
American male short story writers
20th-century American short story writers
20th-century American printmakers
20th-century American male writers
Novelists from New York (state)
Novelists from Indiana
20th-century American non-fiction writers
American male non-fiction writers
20th-century American male artists
20th-century lithographers